Klaus-Peter Ebeling (born 4 August 1944) is an East German sprint canoeist who competed in the late 1960s and early 1970s. Competing He won two medals at the 1970 ICF Canoe Sprint World Championships with a silver in the K-4 1000 m and a bronze in the K-2 1000 m events.

Ebeling also finished sixth in the K-4 1000 m event at the 1968 Summer Olympics in Mexico City.

References

Sports-reference.com profile

1944 births
Canoeists at the 1968 Summer Olympics
German male canoeists
Living people
Olympic canoeists of East Germany
ICF Canoe Sprint World Championships medalists in kayak